Synanthedon loranthi is a moth of the family Sesiidae. It is found in most of Europe (except Ireland, Great Britain, Fennoscandia, the Netherlands, Portugal, the Baltic region and Ukraine) and Asia Minor.

The wingspan is 20–22 mm.

The larvae feed on Viscum album, Viscum album abietis, Viscum album austriacum, Viscum laxum and Loranthus europaeus.

References

Moths described in 1966
Sesiidae
Moths of Europe